Trichomalus is a genus of parasitoid wasps belonging to the family Pteromalidae.

The genus has an almost cosmopolitan distribution.

Species
The following species are recognised in the genus Trichomalus:
 
 Trichomalus acraea (Walker, 1839) 
 Trichomalus acuminatus Delucchi & Graham, 1956
 Trichomalus aglaus (Walker, 1845)
 Trichomalus alonsoi Nieves-Aldrey & Garrido, 1994
 Trichomalus alopius (Walker, 1848)
 Trichomalus althaeae (Erdös, 1953)
 Trichomalus amphimedon (Walker, 1839)
 Trichomalus annulatus (Forster, 1841)
 Trichomalus apertus (Walker, 1835)
 Trichomalus automedon (Walker, 1839)
 Trichomalus bracteatus (Walker, 1835)
 Trichomalus campestris (Walker, 1834)
 Trichomalus cardui (Masi, 1954)
 Trichomalus cerpheres (Walker, 1839)
 Trichomalus cinctus (Forster, 1841)
 Trichomalus conifer (Walker, 1836)
 Trichomalus consuetus (Walker, 1872)
 Trichomalus coryphe (Walker, 1839)
 Trichomalus cristatus (Forster, 1841)
 Trichomalus cupreus Delucchi & Graham, 1956
 Trichomalus curtus (Walker, 1835)
 Trichomalus daimenes (Walker, 1839)
 Trichomalus deiphon (Walker, 1843)
 Trichomalus deudorix (Walker, 1839)
 Trichomalus elongatus Delucchi & Graham, 1956
 Trichomalus eurypon (Walker, 1847)
 Trichomalus exquisitus (Forster, 1841)
 Trichomalus flagellaris Graham, 1969
 Trichomalus frontalis (Thomson, 1878)
 Trichomalus fulgidus (Forster, 1841)
 Trichomalus fulvipes (Walker, 1836)
 Trichomalus generalis (Forster, 1841)
 Trichomalus germanus (Dalla Torre, 1898)
 Trichomalus glabellus (Forster, 1841)
 Trichomalus gracilicornis (Zetterstedt, 1838)
 Trichomalus gynetelus (Walker, 1835)
 Trichomalus habis (Walker, 1843)
 Trichomalus helvipes (Walker, 1834)
 Trichomalus hippo (Walker, 1838)
 Trichomalus inscitus (Walker, 1835)
 Trichomalus intestinarius (Forster, 1841)
 Trichomalus kannurensis Sureshan & Narendran, 1995
 Trichomalus keralensis Sureshan, 2002
 Trichomalus lepidus (Forster, 1841)
 Trichomalus lonchaeae Boucek, 1959
 Trichomalus lucidus (Walker, 1835)
 Trichomalus nanus (Walker, 1836)
 Trichomalus norvegicus Hedqvist, 1982
 Trichomalus notabilis (Forster, 1841)
 Trichomalus obsessorius (Forster, 1841)
 Trichomalus oxygyne Graham, 1969
 Trichomalus palustris Erdos, 1957
 Trichomalus perfectus (Walker, 1835)
 Trichomalus pexatus (Walker, 1835)
 Trichomalus pherospilus Dzhanokmen, 1975
 Trichomalus pilosus (Ratzeburg, 1844)
 Trichomalus placidus (Walker, 1834)
 Trichomalus posticus (Walker, 1834)
 Trichomalus repandus (Walker, 1835)
 Trichomalus robustus (Walker, 1835)
 Trichomalus rufinus (Walker, 1835)
 Trichomalus rugosus Delucchi & Graham, 1956
 Trichomalus saptine (Walker, 1839)
 Trichomalus statutus (Forster, 1841)
 Trichomalus sufflatus Delucchi, 1962
 Trichomalus tenellus (Walker, 1834)
 Trichomalus xanthe (Walker, 1845)

References

Pteromalidae
Hymenoptera genera